Unlike most European countries, the Catholic Church in Romania comprises in a single national episcopal conference both Latin and two Eastern Catholic churches (one of which being nation-specific):
 A Latin hierarchy
 one ecclesiastical province with four suffragan sees 
 an exempt non-metropolitan archdiocese
 Two Eastern Catholic rite-specific particular churches sui iuris:
 The Romanian Greek Catholic Church (Byzantine Rite (Greek Catholic) in Rumanian language, comprising the Ecclesiastical province of Făgăraş and Alba Iulia, whose Metropolitan Archbishop is the Major Archbishop (almost Patriarch) of the whole rite-specific particular church sui iuris, and all its four Romanian Suffragan Eparchies (dioceses). 
 An Armenian Catholic Ordinariate for Eastern Catholic faithful.

There is also an Apostolic nunciature as papal diplomatic representation (embassy-level) in the national capital Bucharest, into which is also vested the Apostolic nunciature to neighbouring Moldova (Ex-Soviet, ethnic Romanians).

Current Dioceses

Latin Hierarchy

Ecclesiastical Province of Bucharest 
 Metropolitan Archdiocese of Bucharest 
Diocese of Iași 
Diocese of Oradea Mare
Diocese of Satu Mare
Diocese of Timișoara

Exempt 
 Archdiocese of Alba Iulia (sui iuris, not Metropolitan)

Eastern Catholic

Armenian Catholic Church 
(Armenian Rite in Armenian language)

 Armenian Catholic Ordinariate of Romania, with seat at Gherla

Romanian (Greek) Catholic Ecclesiastical Province of Făgăraş and Alba Iulia 
(Romanian Greek Catholic Church, Romanian language Byzantine (Greek) Rite)

(Metropolitan) Major Archdiocese of Făgăraș și Alba Iulia
Eparchy of Bucharest
Eparchy of Cluj-Gherla 
Eparchy of Lugoj
Eparchy of Maramureș
Eparchy of Oradea Mare

Defunct jurisdictions

Titular see 
Only the Latin Titular archbishopric (non-Metropolitan) Constantia in Scythia

Other defunct Latin jurisdictions 
(Excluding merely renamed/promoted predecessors of current jurisdictions)

 Latin Diocese of Argeș
 Diocese of Bacău
 Diocese of Milcovia
 Diocese of Moldovița

Eastern Catholic defunct jurisdictions 
 Ruthenian Catholic Apostolic Administration of Targul-Siret (Ruthenian Greek Catholic Church, Byzantine Rite)

See also 
 Catholic Church in Romania
 List of Catholic dioceses (structured view)
 the Diocese of Chișinău

Sources and external links 
 GCatholic.org.
 Catholic-Hierarchy entry.

Romania
Catholic dioceses